Like Father, Like Son, also known as The Young Sinner, is a 1961 American film written, produced and directed by and starring Tom Laughlin. The film was shot in 1961 but not released until 1965 as part of a double feature with A Swingin' Summer. A name used for trailers was "Among the Thorns", and a working title for the film was "We Are All Christ".

Premise
A small town football star is expelled from high school after being caught in bed with his girlfriend.

Cast
 Tom Laughlin as Cris Wotan
 Stefanie Powers as Ginny Miller
 William Wellman Jr. as John
 Robert Fuca as Priest (credited as Robert Angelo)
 Linda March as Tury Martin
 James Stacy as Art
 Chris Robinson as Bobby
 Dennis O'Flaherty as Marty
 Bob Colonna as Harry
 Roxanne Heard as Joan Meyers
 Jack Starrett as Football Coach Jennings
 John Burns as Head Coach Ferguson
 Ed Cook as Assistant Coach Webster

References

External links

1961 films
1960s English-language films
Films critical of religion
American romantic drama films
1961 romantic drama films
Films directed by Tom Laughlin
1960s American films